Max Hans Rehberg (born 13 September 2003) is a German tennis player.

Rehberg has a career high ATP singles ranking of world No. 424, achieved on 21 November 2022, and a career high ATP doubles ranking of No. 1509, achieved on 29 August 2022.

He made his ATP main draw debut at the 2022 BMW Open after receiving a wildcard into the singles and doubles main draws.

Singles performance timeline

ATP Challenger and ITF World Tennis Tour finals

Singles: 3 (1–2)

References

External links

2003 births
Living people
German male tennis players
Sportspeople from Munich